In the theory of quantum communication, the entanglement-assisted stabilizer formalism is a method for protecting quantum information with the help of entanglement shared between a sender and receiver before they transmit quantum data over a quantum communication channel. It extends the standard stabilizer formalism
by including shared entanglement (Brun et al. 2006).
The advantage of entanglement-assisted stabilizer codes is that the sender can
exploit the error-correcting properties of an arbitrary set of Pauli operators.
The sender's Pauli operators do not necessarily have to form an
Abelian subgroup of the Pauli group  over  qubits.
The sender can make clever use of her shared
ebits so that the global stabilizer is Abelian and thus forms a valid
quantum error-correcting code.

Definition 

We review the construction of an entanglement-assisted code (Brun et al. 2006). Suppose that
there is a nonabelian subgroup  of size .
Application of the fundamental theorem of symplectic geometry (Lemma 1 in the first external reference)
states that there exists a minimal set of independent generators

The decomposition of  into the above minimal generating set
determines that the code requires  ancilla qubits and  ebits. The code
requires an ebit for every anticommuting pair in the minimal generating set.
The simple reason for this requirement is that an ebit is a simultaneous
-eigenstate of the Pauli operators . The second qubit
in the ebit transforms the anticommuting pair  into a
commuting pair . The above decomposition also
minimizes the number of ebits required for the code---it is an optimal decomposition.

We can partition the nonabelian group  into two subgroups: the
isotropic subgroup  and the entanglement subgroup
. The isotropic subgroup  is a commuting
qubits:
.

The elements of the entanglement subgroup  come in
anticommuting pairs and thus correspond to ebits:
.

Entanglement-assisted stabilizer code error correction conditions 

The two subgroups  and  play a role in the
error-correcting conditions for the entanglement-assisted stabilizer
formalism. An entanglement-assisted code corrects errors in a set
 if for all ,

Operation 

The operation of an entanglement-assisted code is as follows. The sender
performs an encoding unitary on her unprotected qubits, ancilla qubits, and
her half of the ebits. The unencoded state is a simultaneous +1-eigenstate of
the following Pauli operators:

The Pauli operators to the right of the vertical bars indicate the receiver's half
of the shared ebits. The encoding unitary transforms the unencoded Pauli operators
to the following encoded Pauli operators:

The sender transmits all of her qubits over the noisy quantum channel. The
receiver then possesses the transmitted qubits and his half of the ebits. He
measures the above encoded operators to diagnose the error. The last step is
to correct the error.

Rate of an entanglement-assisted code 

We can interpret the rate of an entanglement-assisted code
in three different ways (Wilde and Brun 2007b).
Suppose that an entanglement-assisted quantum code encodes  information
qubits into  physical qubits with the help of  ebits.

 The entanglement-assisted rate assumes that entanglement shared between sender and receiver is free. Bennett et al. make this assumption when deriving the entanglement assisted capacity of a quantum channel for sending quantum information.
 The trade-off rate assumes that entanglement is not free and a rate pair determines performance. The first number in the pair is the number of noiseless qubits generated per channel use, and the second number in the pair is the number of ebits consumed per channel use. Quantum information theorists have computed asymptotic trade-off curves that bound the rate region in which achievable rate pairs lie.
 The catalytic rate assumes that bits of entanglement are built up at the expense of transmitted qubits. A noiseless quantum channel or the encoded use of noisy quantum channel are two different ways to build up entanglement between a sender and receiver.

Which interpretation is most reasonable depends on the context in which we use
the code.
performance, regardless of which definition of the rate we use to interpret
that performance.

Example of an entanglement-assisted code 

We present an example of an entanglement-assisted code
that corrects an arbitrary single-qubit error (Brun et al. 2006). Suppose
the sender wants to use the quantum error-correcting properties of the
following nonabelian subgroup of :

The first two generators anticommute. We obtain a modified third generator by
multiplying the third generator by the second. We then multiply the last
generator by the first, second, and modified third generators. The
error-correcting properties of the generators are invariant under these
operations. The modified generators are as follows:

The above set of generators have the commutation relations given by the
fundamental theorem of symplectic geometry:

The above set of generators is unitarily equivalent to the following canonical
generators:

We can add one ebit to resolve the anticommutativity of the first two
generators and obtain the canonical stabilizer:

The receiver Bob possesses the qubit on the left and the sender Alice
possesses the four qubits on the right. The following state is an eigenstate
of the above stabilizer

where  is a qubit that the sender wants to
encode. The encoding unitary then rotates the canonical stabilizer to the following set of globally commuting
generators:

The receiver measures the above generators upon receipt of all qubits to
detect and correct errors.

Encoding algorithm 

We continue with the previous example. We
detail an algorithm for determining an encoding circuit and the optimal number
of ebits for the entanglement-assisted code---this algorithm first appeared in the appendix of (Wilde and Brun 2007a) and later in the appendix of (Shaw et al. 2008). The operators in
the above example have the following representation as a binary
matrix (See the stabilizer code article):

Call the matrix to the left of the vertical bar the "
matrix" and the matrix to the right of the vertical bar the
" matrix."

The algorithm consists of row and column operations on the above matrix. Row
operations do not affect the error-correcting properties of the code but are
crucial for arriving at the optimal decomposition from the fundamental theorem
of symplectic geometry. The operations available for manipulating columns of
the above matrix are Clifford operations. Clifford
operations preserve the Pauli group  under conjugation. The
CNOT gate, the Hadamard gate, and the Phase gate generate the Clifford group.
A CNOT gate from qubit  to qubit  adds column  to column  in the
 matrix and adds column  to column  in the  matrix. A Hadamard
gate on qubit  swaps column  in the  matrix with column  in the
 matrix and vice versa. A phase gate on qubit  adds column  in the
 matrix to column  in the  matrix. Three CNOT gates implement a
qubit swap operation. The effect of a swap on qubits

The algorithm begins by computing the symplectic product between the first row
and all other rows. We emphasize that the symplectic product here is the
standard symplectic product. Leave the matrix as it is if the first row is not
symplectically orthogonal to the second row or if the first row is
symplectically orthogonal to all other rows. Otherwise, swap the second row
with the first available row that is not symplectically orthogonal to the
first row. In our example, the first row is not symplectically orthogonal to
the second so we leave all rows as they are.

Arrange the first row so that the top left entry in the  matrix is one. A
CNOT, swap, Hadamard, or combinations of these operations can achieve this
result. We can have this result in our example by swapping qubits one and two.
The matrix becomes

Perform CNOTs to clear the entries in the  matrix in the top row to the
right of the leftmost entry. These entries are already zero in this example so
we need not do anything. Proceed to the clear the entries in the first row of
the  matrix. Perform a phase gate to clear the leftmost entry in the first
row of the  matrix if it is equal to one. It is equal to zero in this case
so we need not do anything. We then use Hadamards and CNOTs to clear the other
entries in the first row of the  matrix.

We perform the above operations for our example. Perform a Hadamard on qubits
two and three. The matrix becomes

Perform a CNOT from qubit one to qubit two and from qubit one to qubit three.
The matrix becomes

The first row is complete. We now proceed to clear the entries in the second
row. Perform a Hadamard on qubits one and four. The matrix becomes

Perform a CNOT from qubit one to qubit two and from qubit one to qubit four.
The matrix becomes

The first two rows are now complete. They need one ebit to compensate for
their anticommutativity or their nonorthogonality with respect to the
symplectic product.

Now we perform a "Gram-Schmidt
orthogonalization" with respect to the symplectic product.
Add row one to any other row that has one as the leftmost entry in its 
matrix. Add row two to any other row that has one as the leftmost entry in its
 matrix. For our example, we add row one to row four and we add row two to
rows three and four. The matrix becomes

The first two rows are now symplectically orthogonal to all other rows per the
fundamental theorem of symplectic geometry.
We proceed with the same algorithm on the next two rows. The next two rows are
symplectically orthogonal to each other so we can deal with them individually.
Perform a Hadamard on qubit two. The matrix becomes

Perform a CNOT from qubit two to qubit three and from qubit two to qubit
four. The matrix becomes

Perform a phase gate on qubit two:

Perform a Hadamard on qubit three followed by a CNOT from qubit two to qubit
three:

Add row three to row four and perform a Hadamard on qubit two:

Perform a Hadamard on qubit four followed by a CNOT from qubit three to qubit
four. End by performing a Hadamard on qubit three:

The above matrix now corresponds to the canonical Pauli operators. Adding one half of an ebit to the receiver's side
gives the canonical stabilizer whose
simultaneous +1-eigenstate is the above state.
The above operations in reverse order
take the canonical stabilizer to the encoded
stabilizer.

References 

 
 Min-Hsiu Hsieh. Entanglement-assisted Coding Theory. Ph.D. Dissertation, University of Southern California, August 2008. Available at https://arxiv.org/abs/0807.2080
 Mark M. Wilde. Quantum Coding with Entanglement. Ph.D. Dissertation, University of Southern California, August 2008. Available at https://arxiv.org/abs/0806.4214
 
 
 
 
 
 
 

Linear algebra